Andorno Micca is a comune (municipality) in the Province of Biella in the Italian region Piedmont, located about  northeast of Turin and about  northwest of Biella.

Overview
It is located in the Valle Cervo, at the feet of the Biellese Prealps.

The comune takes its second name from Pietro Micca, a hero of the siege of Turin against the French (1706).

The Sacro Monte di Andorno is named after this village, despite it is not in the comune territory.

See also
Ratafia
San Giuseppe di Casto

References

External links

 Official website